Austin Edwin Dewar (24 April 1912 – 15 December 1985) was a Liberal party member of the House of Commons of Canada. He was born in Indian Head, Saskatchewan and became an insurance agent, contractor, farmer, grain merchant and hotelier by career.

He was first elected to Parliament at the Qu'Appelle riding in the 1949 general election. After serving in the 21st Canadian Parliament, Dewar did not seek another federal term in the 1953 election.

References

External links
 

1912 births
1985 deaths
Canadian farmers
Liberal Party of Canada MPs
Members of the House of Commons of Canada from Saskatchewan